Uler is an unincorporated community in Roane County, West Virginia, United States.

The original application for the post office contained the suggestion Eulah, but a postal error accounts for the error in spelling, which was never corrected.

References

Unincorporated communities in Roane County, West Virginia
Unincorporated communities in West Virginia